George Webb Morell (January 8, 1815 – February 11, 1883) was a civil engineer, lawyer, farmer, and a Union general in the American Civil War.

Early life
Morell was born in Cooperstown, New York. His father was George Morell, the chief justice of the Michigan Supreme Court. He graduated from the United States Military Academy, first in his class of 56 cadets, in 1835 and was commissioned a brevet second lieutenant in the Corps of Engineers. He resigned from the Army on June 30, 1837, and became a civil engineer for the Charleston and Cincinnati Railroad and later for the Michigan Central Railroad. He moved to New York City in 1839 and worked as a lawyer. He was a commissioner for the circuit court of the Southern District of New York from 1854 to 1861.

Civil War
Since 1852, Morell had served as a colonel in the New York Militia. He was promoted to brigadier general of volunteers on August 9, 1861, and served in brigade and division command in the Army of the Potomac during the Peninsula Campaign. Morell led the 1st Division, V Corps, during most of this period. His close association with Brig. Gen. Fitz John Porter, his corps commander, negatively affected his career prospects, as Porter was court-martialed for dereliction in the Second Battle of Bull Run. Morell testified on Porter's behalf at the court-martial, effectively ruining his military career. After the Battle of Antietam, he saw no additional field service. Morell was appointed a major general on July 4, 1862, but the appointment expired the following year without confirmation by the United States Senate. He commanded the Draft Depot in Indianapolis, Indiana, for most of 1864 and was mustered out from volunteer service on December 15, 1864.

Postbellum
Morell worked as a farmer after his military service. He died in Scarborough, New York, and is buried there in the chancel of St. Mary's Episcopal Church.

See also

List of American Civil War generals (Union)

References

 Eicher, John H., and David J. Eicher. Civil War High Commands. Stanford, CA: Stanford University Press, 2001. .
 Warner, Ezra J. Generals in Blue: Lives of the Union Commanders. Baton Rouge: Louisiana State University Press, 1964. .

1815 births
1883 deaths
People from Cooperstown, New York
People of New York (state) in the American Civil War
Union Army generals
United States Military Academy alumni
People from Briarcliff Manor, New York
American civil engineers
Farmers from New York (state)
Lawyers from New York City
19th-century American lawyers